A musical guest is a singer, band, or other musician who makes a brief musical appearance on a television program of a non-musical nature.

While some shows have a format that traditionally includes numerous performances by musical guests (such as Saturday Night Live), other shows include popular musicians to boost ratings for particular episodes (such as on cartoons or sitcoms) or to help new artists gain exposure (such as The Tonight Show or The Late Show).

While many shows employ their own live band, this regular band is not considered a musical "guest". Additionally, if the theme of a program revolves completely around live music (such as American Idol or Star Search), the musicians who appear are generally not considered musical guests, as they are either contestants or are performing a different, non-musical function (such as judging the competition).

Depending on the format of the show, musical guests may simply perform a song and leave the stage, while other shows include interviews with the musicians following their performance. On Saturday Night Live, some musical guests have participated in comedy sketches with the stars of the show.

Partial list of programs with musical guests
All That
The Dick Cavett Show
The Ed Sullivan Show
The Tonight Show
Late Show with David Letterman
The Late Late Show
Late Night with Conan O'Brien
Last Call with Carson Daly
Saturday Night Live
Mad TV
Scooby-Doo
The Simpsons
Gilmore Girls
Beverly Hills, 90210
Chappelle's Show
Jimmy Kimmel Live!
The Rosie O'Donnell Show
The Arsenio Hall Show

Television terminology
Music television